The Narasimhaswamy temple in Namakkal, a town in Namakkal district in the South Indian state of Tamil Nadu, is dedicated to the Hindu god Narasimha, an avatar of Vishnu. Constructed in the Dravidian style of architecture and Rock-cut architecture, the temple is located in the Salem–Namakkal–Trichy Road. The legend of the temple is associated with Narasimha, an avatar of Hindu god Vishnu appearing for Lakshmi, his consort, and Hanuman. Based on the architectural features, historians believe that the temple was built during the 8th century by the Adiyamans also called Satyaputras as evident from the inscription mentioning the temple as 'Adiyendra Vishnu Gruham' or 'The house of Vishnu of the Adiyaman kings'. The temple does not find a mention in Nalayira Divya Prabhandams, and thus is not listed in Divya Desam group of 108 temples.

The temple has a pillared hall leading to the sanctum, which has rock-cut architecture. The sanctum sanctorum is rock-cut and square in shape with a black background. The sanctum has three sculpted cells, two pillars and a verandah in front of it. The central sanctum sanctorum niche houses the image of Narasimha in sitting posture, called Asana murti. The temple complex houses two other sanctums. These sanctums house Namagiri Tayar and Lakshmi Narayana. There is a separate shrine for the goddess Namagiri Lakshmi, who is also referred to as Namagiri Tayar. 

The temple is open from 7:00 am – 1:00 pm and 4:30 - 8:00 pm. Four daily rituals and many yearly festivals are held at the temple, of which fifteen-day Panguni Uthiram festival celebrated during the Tamil month of Panguni (March - April) when the image of presiding deities are taken around the streets of the temple, being the most prominent. The annual car festival for the Narasimhaswamy temple is celebrated in March and April every year (The Tamil month of Panguni) as per the Vaikhanasa tradition.

The temple is maintained and administered by the Hindu Religious and Endowment Board of the Government of Tamil Nadu.

Legend

As per Hindu legend, Hiranyakashipu, an asura king, was troubling the devas (celestial deities) as he got a boon from Brahma that no human can kill him, neither could he be killed in morning, noon or night nor in air, water, or the ground. His son Prahlada was an ardent devotee of Vishnu, garnering the hate of his father. Hiranyakashipu tried to slay Prahalada at various times, just to be saved by the divine grace of Vishnu. During the last heated argument between the two, Hiranyakashipu was asking if Vishnu was present everywhere and went on to break a pillar with his weapon. Vishnu assumed the avatar of Narasimha and came out of the opening in the pillar. Narasimha was a half-human with a lion face and slayed Hiranyakashipu on an evening time in a doorway, which was neither land nor air.

Ages past by, when Lakshmi, the consort of Vishnu was doing penance at this place, seeking his boons. Hanuman (locally called Anjaneyar) was carrying an image made of shaligrama and Lakshmi requested him to help her with a view of Vishnu in the form of Narasimha. Hanuman entrusted the shaligrama to her and requested her to hold it until he returns. Lakshmi could not bear the weight and placed the image at this place, which grew into a mount before Hanuman could return. Narasimha appeared before both of them and set his abode at this place.

History

The temple is believed to be built during the 8th century by the Pandya kings in rock-cut architecture. Historian Soundara Rajan places the date to a pre-Varagunan I (800–830) era on the 8th century. Based on the palaeography and rock-cut architecture, P.R. Srinivasan has placed it at 8th century. Most of the historians have compared the temples with similar architectural elements found in Badami Caves (6th century) and a possible influence. Some historians have argued that the Alvars during the Bhakti tradition have discarded Rock-cut images and hence no mention is found in the Nalayira Divya Prabandham about this temple. But the argument is disproved by other historians who have quoted rock-cut temples like Thirumeyyam in Pudukottai district and Ninra Narayana Perumal temple  in Virudhunagar district finding mention in the canon. The records of the details of the inscriptions are found in the Annual report of Epigraphy -1961. There are no inscriptions in the temple, but an undated inscription in the Ranganatha temple, which is on the upper cave in the hill. Historians believe it is possible that both the temples were built during the same period.

Architecture

The temple is located along Namakkal-Salem road in Namakkal town, Namakkal district in Tamil Nadu.  The temple carved out of an imposing hill, is located in the downhill of the Namakkal Fort, on the western flank of the hill. The temple has a flat gateway tower and a second entrance, also with a flat gateway leading to the pillared halls. The main sanctum sanctorum houses the image of Lord Narasimha in sitting posture, called Asanamurthi with two images under his feet. The sanctum is rock-cut and square in shape with a black background. The sanctum has three sculpted cells, two pillars and a verandah in front of it. The image of Narasimhar is treated as a Yogasana image, with the images under his feet seen to be the Sun and the Moon. It is not called a Bhogasana as the consorts on either side of him are absent. He has Shiva and Brahma on his either sides and he is sported with two hands holding the conch and the chakra. There is a panel depicting the narrative of Vamana, who takes water from Mahabali and later grows big as Trivikrama to submerge Bali under his feet as per the Skanda Purana. Historians consider this as a deviation from the monoscenic sculptures in temples of Kanchipuram and Mahabalipuram.

The temple has other sculptural relief on the walls of the temple depicting Trivikrama, Narasimha slaying Hiranyakashipu and Ananta sayana Vishnu. The temple tank, Kamalalayam, is located outside the temple. There are similar rock-cut images in the temple halfway up the Namakkal Fort. Of note, it was in front of Namagiri Narashimhar that Saint Purandaradasa composed his famous song "Simha Rupanada Sri Hari, Namagirishane".

The temple complex houses two other sanctums. These sanctums house Namagiri Tayar and Lakshmi Narayana.

There are number of sacred bathing places or tirthams in hollows in the sides of the rock and the largest of them is called "Kamalalayam" which is sacred to Lakshmi.

Influence on Srinivasa Ramanujan

The great Indian mathematician Srinivasa Ramanujan credited his mathematical findings to Namagiri Tayar, his family's goddess. According to Ramanujan, she appeared to him in visions, proposing mathematical formulas that he would then have to verify. One such event was described by him as follows: "While asleep, I had an unusual experience. There was a red screen formed by flowing blood, as it were. I was observing it. Suddenly a hand began to write on the screen. I became all attention. That hand wrote a number of elliptic integrals. They stuck to my mind. As soon as I woke up, I committed them to writing." Furthermore, Ramanujan's mother received permission from Namagiri Tayar for Ramanujan to go to England in a dream.

Festival and religious practices

The temple priests perform the pooja (rituals) during festivals and on a daily basis. The temple rituals are performed four times a day: Kalasandhi at 7:00 a.m., Uchikala poojai at 12:30 p.m., Sayarakshai at 4:30 p.m., and Arthajama Pooja at 7:45 p.m.Each ritual has three steps: alangaram (decoration), neivethanam (food offering) and deepa aradanai (waving of lamps) for the presiding deities. There are weekly, monthly and fortnightly rituals performed in the temple. The temple is open from 7:00 am – 1:00 pm and 4:30 - 8:00 pm and The Great Hanuman Temple is open Morning 6.30 am to 1.00 pm. and Evening 4.30 pm to 9.00 pm.  on all days except during festive occasions when it has extended timings. The major festivals of the temple is the fifteen day Panguni Uthiram festival celebrated during the Tamil month of Panguni (March - April) when the image of presiding deities are taken around the streets of the temple in a temple chariot. The sacred marriage of the presiding deity is also performed during the function. Other festivals of the temple include Chittirai Tamil New year, Vaigasi Visagam, Telugu New Year, Avani Pavitrotsavam, Narasimhar Jayanthi, Vaikuntha Ekadashi and Thai Pongal during various months of the year. In modern times, the Namakkal district administration has identified the temple as one of the prominent tourist attractions in the district. The temple is maintained and administered by the Hindu Religious and Endowment Board of the Government of Tamil Nadu.

References

External links
 Home page of Anjaneyar temple

Photo Gallery 

Hindu temples in Namakkal district
Purana temples of Vishnu
Hindu cave temples in Tamil Nadu
Namakkal
Narasimha temples